Round Top-Carmine is a 1A public high school located in Carmine, Texas (USA). It is part of the Round Top-Carmine Independent School District located in northeast Fayette County.   In 2013, the school was rated "Met Standard" by the Texas Education Agency.

Athletics
The Round Top-Carmine Cubs and Cubettes compete in the following sports:

Volleyball, Cross Country, Basketball, cheer, Tennis, Track, Golf & Baseball

State Titles
Girls Basketball  
1966(B), 1971(B), 1972(B)
Volleyball 
1995(1A), 1996(1A), 2003(1A), 2010(1A), 2013(1A), 2015 (1A)

State Finalist
Girls Basketball  
1965(B)
Volleyball 
1989(1A), 1990(1A), 1994(1A), 1997(1A), 1999(1A), 2000(1A), 2001(1A), 2012(1A), 2019(1A)

Boys Cross Country
2016 (1A) Joseph McConnell

References

External links
 Round Top-Carmine ISD

Schools in Fayette County, Texas
Public high schools in Texas